Dustin Brown and Jesse Witten were the defending champions, but they decided not to compete this year.

Travis Rettenmaier and Simon Stadler won the title, defeating Travis Parrott and Andreas Siljeström 6–4, 6–4 in the final.

Seeds

Draw

Draw

References
 Doubles Draw

Tennis Napoli Cup - Doubles
2011 Doubles